Patrick  Masterson  (born 1936, in Dublin) is a former president of University College Dublin and the European University Institute.

Biography 

He has held numerous appointments in academia, and has authored several books and publications on philosophy and religion. He has most recently produced a 'comic campus novel' Quality Time at St Chinian in 2017.

He received a First class degree from University College and then took a Ph.D. at Leuven in 1962.

He was a member of the staff of University College Dublin prior to being appointed Dean of the Faculty of Philosophy and Sociology in 1980, Registrar in 1983 and President from 1986 until leaving in December 1993 to become Principal of the European University Institute, Florence, a post he held from 1994 to 2002.

He was Vice-Chancellor of the National University of Ireland from 1987 to 1988.

He is Emeritus Professor of Philosophy of Religion at University College Dublin.

Publications

 
 The Sense of Creation - Experience and the God Beyond (Ashgate 2008).
 With Seamus Heaney: Articulations: poetry, philosophy, and the shaping of culture (Royal Irish Academy, 2008)
 Approaching God: Between Phenomenology and Theology (Bloomsbury 2013).
 Quality Time at St Chinian (Liberties Press, 2017)

References

1936 births
Living people
Irish educators
Irish writers
Academics of University College Dublin
Presidents of University College Dublin
Presidents of the European University Institute